Iiro Rantala (born 1970, in Helsinki) is a Finnish jazz pianist. He studied piano in the jazz department of Sibelius Academy and classical piano at the Manhattan School of Music. He is one of the best known Finnish jazz pianists, both in Finland and abroad. Rantala is a pianist and composer with Trio Töykeät, a Finnish jazz trio. In addition to jazz, he has composed some classical pieces, most notably the Concerto for Piano and Concerto in G♯ΔA♭.

In 2008, he released the album Elmo with his new formation, the Iiro Rantala New Trio. The members of the trio are Rantala (piano), Marzi Nyman (guitar) and Felix Zenger (beatbox).

Discography

Trio Töykeät 
 Päivää (Sonet, 1990)
 International version: G'day (Emarcy, 1993)
 Jazzlantis (Emarcy, 1995)
 Sisu (PolyGram Emarcy, 1998)
 Kudos (Universal Music Group, 2000)
 High Standards (EMI Blue Note, 2003)
 Wake (EMI Blue Note, 2005)
 One Night in Tampere (EMI Blue Note, 2007)

Big Bad Family 
 Big Bad Family (Kompass, 1988)
 Big Bad Family (re-release) (Final Mix Records, 1996)

Tango Kings 
 Tango Kings (Big World, 1995)

Sinfonia Lahti, Trio Töykeät, Jaakko ja Pekka Kuusisto
 Music! (BIS Records, 2002)

SaloRantala Soi 
 SaloRantala Soi! (Johanna Kustannus, 2003)
 Talvijalka (Sateen ääni, 2009)

Rantala & Tapiola Sinfonietta 
 Concerto for Piano and Concerto in G♯ΔA♭ (Ondine, 2006)

Iiro Rantala New Trio 
 Elmo (Rockadillo Records, 2008)

Pekka Kuusisto & Iiro Rantala 
 Subterráneo, (Liverace, 2009)

Iiro Rantala solo piano 
 Lost Heroes, (ACT, 2011)
 My History of Jazz, (ACT, 2012)

Iiro Rantala String Trio 
 Anyone with a Heart, (ACT, 2014)

Iiro Rantala 
 My Working Class Hero, (ACT, 2015)
 How Long Is Now?, (ACT, 2016)
 Good Stuff, (ACT, 2017)
 My Finnish Calendar, (ACT, 2019)
 Potsdam, (ACT, 2022) (live)

References

External links 
Iiro Rantala official homepage
Homepage of Espoo Big Band

1970 births
Living people
Musicians from Helsinki
Finnish classical pianists
Finnish jazz pianists
Manhattan School of Music faculty
Avant-garde jazz pianists
Finnish jazz composers
ACT Music artists
21st-century classical pianists
Trio Töykeät members